Lewes railway station serves the town of Lewes in East Sussex, England. It has five platforms and is on the East Coastway Line,  from  via . Train services are provided by Southern.

The station has a café and there is a taxi office on the main forecourt. There is a small taxi rank outside.

History

The first station in Friars Walk opened on 8 June 1846 was originally built as a terminus on the Brighton line. However, this station became inconvenient after an extension to  opened on 27 June 1846. The new railway met the Brighton line at a junction just west of Lewes Station (i.e. towards Brighton), requiring trains serving Lewes to reverse. The director of the London, Brighton & South Coast Railway called the station "the most incomplete and injudicious station ever erected".

On 2 October 1847, the Keymer Junction to Lewes line opened. New platforms (called Pinwell) were built opposite the terminus, west of the Hastings line branch. On 1 November 1857, a new station was built at the divergence of the Keymer Junction line. The old station closed; the original booking hall with grand classical columns outside survived until the 1960s before it was demolished. The new building was built in the style of a Swiss chalet. A new junction for the realigned Wealden Line opened on 1 October 1868. The new alignment went through part of the station goods yard of the original terminus. Before this change, the Wealden line joined the Keymer line at Hamsey Junction between the north portal of Lewes Tunnel and Cooksbridge Station.

The second station was rebuilt in order to increase platform capacity and reduce the narrow curvature of the track. It opened on 17 June 1889. On 1 October 1889 all passenger services were diverted from the original loop line between Lewes and Southerham Junction onto this alignment. The original route was retained for goods only.

On 5 November 1960, severe flooding of the track caused the suspension of all electric services, and replaced by whatever steam locomotives were available. The Borough Surveyor requested that the London-bound platforms at Lewes station should be blown up to allow flood water to escape via the railway track-bed. However, the British Railways district engineer declined to co-operate. The line to  remained inoperable for some time.

In the 1960s, the original 1846 terminus building fronting the public street (Friars Walk), was demolished. The line to Uckfield closed on 23 February 1969, in order that a relief road in Lewes could be built over the redundant trackbed.

Layout

The station is located at a junction, where two western branches of the East Coastway line (from London and from Brighton) join to continue eastwards towards Eastbourne. Each of the two branches has its own set of platforms (the junction itself is immediately east of the station).
The two sets of platforms together form a "V" shape (keilbahnhof), with a large open area (as well as the main station building) between platforms 2 and 3.

London branch
Platforms 1 and 2 serve the London branch. Both platforms are long enough to accommodate a 12-carriage train.
Platform 2 is usually served by westbound services towards  or  via , although it is also signalled for eastbound departures, meaning it can be used by trains that reverse at the station to run to and from the east.

Brighton branch
Platforms, 3, 4 and 5 are located on the Brighton branch. These platforms are considerably shorter than those on the London side  platforms 3 and 5 are only long enough to accommodate six carriages, while platform 4 can hold seven.
Platforms 4 and 5 are both signalled bi-directionally, but in normal service they are used by westbound trains towards ; through services usually use platform 4, while those that start and terminate here normally run from platform 5.

Services
All services at Lewes are operated by Southern using  and  EMUs.

The typical off-peak service in trains per hour is:
 2 tph to  via 
 2 tph to 
 1 tph to  via Eastbourne (stopping)
 1 tph to  via Eastbourne (semi-fast)

During the peak hours and on Saturdays, the station is served by an additional hourly service between Brighton and Ore.

From May 2023 there will be 2tph off-peak between Brighton and Eastbourne, with 1tph continuing to Ore

These services were discontinued as part of the May 2018 timetable changes due to long journey times and insufficient rolling stock (the line to Ashford is served by 2-car DMUs) which caused overcrowding particularly on the section between Brighton and Eastbourne. Since then, services to and from Ashford have only run as far as Eastbourne.

References
Citations

Sources

External links

Wealden line Campaign

Lewes
Railway stations in East Sussex
DfT Category C2 stations
Former London, Brighton and South Coast Railway stations
Railway stations in Great Britain opened in 1846
Railway stations served by Govia Thameslink Railway
1846 establishments in England